For the Living and the Dead is a 1989 collection of poetry by the Swedish writer Tomas Tranströmer. It received the Nordic Council Literature Prize.

Its 1996 translation into English by Canadian author Don Coles won the John Glassco Translation Prize in 1997.

See also
 1989 in literature
 Swedish literature

References

1989 poetry books
Poetry by Tomas Tranströmer
Swedish poetry collections
Albert Bonniers Förlag books
Nordic Council's Literature Prize-winning works